The 2006 Asian Women's Handball Championship, the eleventh Asian Championship, which was taking place from 1 to 5 July 2006 in Guangzhou, China. It acted as the Asian qualifying tournament for the 2007 World Women's Handball Championship.

Standings

Results
All times are local (UTC+8).

Final standing

References
Results

External links
www.handball.jp

H
H
Asian
Asian Handball Championships
Asian Women's Handball Championship